Ave Maria Church is a Latin Rite, Roman Catholic church in Suai, East Timor. The town of Suai stands 180 km from the Timorese capital of Dili, in the Cova Lima District and is part of the Diocese of Maliana.

The Ave Maria church has a 70-foot-tall steeple.

References

Cova Lima Municipality
Roman Catholic churches in East Timor
Catholic Church in East Timor